Group A of the 2009 Fed Cup Americas Zone Group I was one of two pools in the Americas Zone Group I of the 2009 Fed Cup. Three teams competed in a round robin competition, with the top team and the bottom two teams proceeding to their respective sections of the play-offs: the top team played for advancement to the World Group II Play-offs, while the bottom teams faced potential relegation to Group II.

Puerto Rico vs. Bahamas

Canada vs. Bahamas

Canada vs. Puerto Rico

See also
Fed Cup structure

References

External links
 Fed Cup website

2009 Fed Cup Americas Zone